The 2010 Big Sky men's basketball tournament was played March 6–10, with the opening round quarterfinals held at the higher seed's home arena, both in Montana at Bozeman and Missoula. The semifinals and final were held at the Dee Events Center in Ogden, Utah, the home of regular season champion Weber State.

The top six teams from regular season play qualified and the top two received a bye to the semifinals. Fourth-seed Montana upset host Weber State by a point in the final to earn the automatic bid to the NCAA tournament. As regular season champions who failed to win the tournament, Weber State received an automatic bid to the National Invitation Tournament (NIT).

Bracket

2009–10 Big Sky Conference men's basketball season
Big Sky Conference men's basketball tournament
Big Sky Conference men's basketball tournament
Big Sky Conference men's basketball tournament
Basketball competitions in Ogden, Utah
College sports tournaments in Utah